Tomas Jiménez Álvarez (born 11 May 1979), is a Spanish retired footballer who played as a left defender.

Club career
Born in Salamanca, Region of León, Tomás finished his graduation with local UD Salamanca's youth setup, and made his senior debuts with the reserves in the Tercera División. On 20 September 1998 he appeared in his first game with the main squad, playing the last four minutes of a 3–1 La Liga home win against Deportivo de La Coruña, and he scored his first official goal roughly three years later, but in a 2–4 away loss to Córdoba CF in the Segunda División.

Tomás left Salamanca in 2008, and went on to resume his career in Segunda División B, representing Zamora CF, CP Cacereño, CF Villanovense and CD Guijuelo.

References

External links
 
 Futbolme profile  

1979 births
Living people
Sportspeople from Salamanca
Spanish footballers
Footballers from Castile and León
Association football defenders
La Liga players
Segunda División players
Segunda División B players
Tercera División players
UD Salamanca players
Zamora CF footballers
CP Cacereño players
CF Villanovense players
CD Guijuelo footballers